Caladenia ashbyae, commonly known as the powder-blue china orchid, is a plant in the orchid family Orchidaceae and is endemic to Western Australia. It has a relatively short, broad leaf and one or two pale bluish-mauve flowers.

Description 
The flowers are strongly scented and on rare occasions they are white. The sides of the labellum have minute teeth and there are many scattered, bead-like calli scattered over the labellum. Flowering occurs from October to early November.

Taxonomy and naming 
The powder blue china orchid was first formally described in 2000 Stephen Hopper and Andrew Brown and given the name Cyanicula ashbyae. The description was published in Lindleyana from a specimen collected in the Chiddarcooping Nature Reserve near Mukinbudin. In 2015, as a result of studies of molecular phylogenetics Mark Clements changed the name to Caladenia ashbyae. The specific epithet (ashbyae) honours Miss Alison Ashby who is credited with discovering this species.

Distribution and habitat 
The powder-blue china orchid grows on and near granite outcrops between Pingrup and Beacon in the Avon Wheatbelt, Coolgardie and Mallee biogeographic regions.

Conservation
Caladenia ashbyae is classified as "not threatened" by the Western Australian Government Department of Parks and Wildlife.

References

ashbyae
Endemic orchids of Australia
Orchids of Western Australia
Plants described in 2000
Endemic flora of Western Australia